The governor-general of Mauritius was the representative of the Mauritian monarch in Mauritius from the country's independence in 1968 until it became a Commonwealth republic in 1992.

The governor-general was appointed solely on the advice of the Cabinet of Mauritius, serving at the pleasure of the monarch.

List of governors-general of Mauritius
The following is a list of people who have served as governor-general of Mauritius.

Symbols
 Died in office.

References

Mauritius
 
Heads of state of Mauritius
Lists of political office-holders in Mauritius